The Camillia Smith House is a Queen Anne-styled house built in Waukesha, Wisconsin in 1883. It was added to the National Register of Historic Places in 1983 and to the State Register of Historic Places in 1989.

The house has many standard features of Queen Anne style:  asymmetric design, corner tower, complex roof, and shingled wall surfaces to vary the textures.

References

Houses on the National Register of Historic Places in Wisconsin
National Register of Historic Places in Waukesha County, Wisconsin
Houses in Waukesha County, Wisconsin
Buildings and structures in Waukesha, Wisconsin
Queen Anne architecture in Wisconsin
Houses completed in 1883